Ims is a Norwegian surname. Notable people with the surname include:

 Gry Tofte Ims (born 1986), Norwegian footballer
 Rolf Anker Ims (born 1958), Norwegian ecologist

See also
 IMS (disambiguation)

Norwegian-language surnames